Q'illu Urqu (Quechua q'illu yellow, urqu mountain, "yellow mountain", also spelled Ccellohorcco) is a  mountain in the Andes of Peru. It is situated in the Ayacucho Region, Parinacochas Province, on the border of the districts of Coracora and Upahuacho. Q'illu Urqu lies south of Parququcha.

References 

Mountains of Peru
Mountains of Ayacucho Region